TNT Sports Argentina is a subscription television channel dedicated to the broadcast of the sport of that country, along with ESPN Premium, which began broadcasting on Friday, August 25, 2017, from 6:00 p.m., after the alliance of Turner and Fox by the television rights of the Argentine First Division of Argentine soccer, being replacement of the governmental program Fútbol para Todos.

History 
The channel broadcasts half of the matches of each date of the Argentine Super League and the rest of the deferred matches, which are produced by Tournaments. The channel's studios are located in La Corte, the audiovisual production company belonging to the Ceibo Group that was responsible for making the broadcasts of Fútbol para Todos since 2009 until 2017.

Journalists of TNT Sports interview Lourdes Perez to Las Leoncitas national team after the women's hockey final at the 2018 Youth Olympic Games in Buenos Aires. The channel has a similarity with the former TyC organization, since it costs AR$665 per month to watch the games.

Coverage

Current

Broadcasting rights

Football (including futsal and beach soccer) 
 FIFA Club World Cup (all matches exclusively live in 2019 and 2020, also available for Chile viewers via TNT Sports Chile)
 L'Alcúdia International Football Tournament
 Futbol de Verano
 AFA
 Primera División de Argentina
 Copa de la Liga Profesional
 Campeonato de Futsal
 Supercopa de Futsal
 Supercopa Argentina
 Primera División de Chile
Euro 2020

Basketball 
 FIBA Intercontinental Cup

Padel 
 World Padel Tour

Programs 
 Futsal Libre TV
 Fútbol femenino
 Clásico BBVA
 La previa
 Lo mejor de la Fecha
 TNT al límite
 TNT Box (TRB Boxeo e Internacionales)
 TNT Data Sports
 TNT Play Sports
 TNT Gol
 Club Atlético TNT
 Halcones y palomas
 Tres Arriba
 Primera Tapa
 Pelota al Piso
 De memoria
 Último hombre
 Nos falta un jugador
 Generación E: Desafío eco YPF
 Sueño Dorado
 Tarde de campeones
 Lo mejor de la fecha
 Fútbol a la carta
 Estadio TNT Sports
 La fecha TNT
 Interior futbolero
 Mundo Padel
 Historias de El Gráfico
 La Pasión… según Sacheri
 Artistas del Knockout
 CNN Deportes Radio

Former

Broadcasting rights

Football (including futsal and beach soccer) 
 Copa América Femenina (2018)
 Superliga Argentina de Fútbol
 Copa de la Superliga

Personnels 

  Pablo Giralt
  Hernán Feler
  Alejandro Uriona
  Leandro Zapponi
  Fernando Lingiardi
  Ariel Helueni
  Arturo Bulián
  Leo Gentili
  Ignacio Fusco
  Matías Martin
  Carlos Fernando Navarro Montoya
  Fernando Pacini
  Juan Pablo Varsky
  Hernán Castillo
  Fabián Godoy
  Román Iucht
  Fernando Salceda
  Enrique Gastañaga
  Francisco Noriega
  Manuel Olivari
  Antonella Valderrey
  Ángela Lerena
  Emiliano Espinoza
  Gonzalo Rey
  Federico Rodas
  Nicolás Haase
  Ignacio Bezruk
  Maximiliano Grillo
  Nicolás Fazio
  Nicolás Latini
  Diego Olave
  Juan Pablo Vila
  Nicolás Distasio
  Diego Provenzano
  Sebastián Larroca
  Juani Majluf 
  Diego Della Sala
  Martín Costa
  Veronica Brunati
  Paula Pallas
  Osvaldo Principi
  Guillermo Favale
  Daniel Guiñazú
  Leonardo Benatar
  Luis Rubio
  Rosario Cuenca
  Mariano Peluffo
  Magdalena Aicega
  Florencia Maignon
  María del Mar Onega
  Iván Núñez Pérez
  Augusto Sciutto
  Martín Smith
  Ivana Nadal
  Jorge Rinaldi
  Fernando Czyz
  Martín Castilla
  Santiago do Rego
  Micaela Vázquez
  Sebastián Di Nardo
  Kevin Aiello
  Eduardo Sacheri
  Matías Bustos Milla
  Chiche Almozny

Logos

See also 
 ESPN (Latin America)
 Fox Sports (Latin America)
 TyC Sports
 Canal del Fútbol (Chile) (TNT Sports Chile)
 Esporte Interativo (TNT Sports Brazil)

References

External links 
 Official website

Television networks in Argentina
TNT Sports
Latin American cable television networks
Television channels and stations established in 2017
Spanish-language television stations
Companies based in Buenos Aires
Sports television networks